Alaena dodomaensis is a butterfly in the family Lycaenidae. It is found in Tanzania. The habitat consists of medium altitude Brachystegia woodland and thornbush on rocky hillsides at altitudes ranging from 700 to 1,400 metres.

References

Butterflies described in 1983
Alaena
Endemic fauna of Tanzania
Butterflies of Africa